Thomas Smith, better known by his stage name Jemini the Gifted One, is a rapper from Brooklyn, New York. He has most notably worked with Danger Mouse on the 2003 album Ghetto Pop Life, which features rappers such as The Pharcyde, Tha Alkaholiks, J-Zone, and Prince Po from Organized Konfusion.

Career
Jemini released a 7 track promo-only EP only Mercury/Polygram in 1995 called Scars and Pain.

"Funk Soul Sensation", produced by Organized Konfusion, was the debut single. In a review, Billboard called it "[s]ensational, smart soul." It peaked at number 36 on Billboards Hot Rap Songs chart. A remix of "Funk Soul Sensation" was released later in 1995 on 12" vinyl. The B-side was "Funk Soul Sensation pt.II", which continued the dual personas of "The Gifted One" and the "Funk Soul Sensation" rapping back and forth to each other. In 1997, Jemini released another promotional single titled "Who Wanna Step To Dis" which was followed by 1998's "I.M.C.U.D.O.N.T./Who Wanna Step II Dis."

His 2003 collaboration with Danger Mouse, Ghetto Pop Life, landed the duo on The Guardian's list of The Forty Best Bands in the US, stating that the album "opts for a charming musical eclecticism and a fierce lyrical intelligence that bears comparison to prime-time Public Enemy." The Independent wrote, "Along with Outkast's double-header, Speakerboxxx/The Love Below, Ghetto Pop Life is this year's most engrossing hip-hop record."

In 2006, another rapper by the name of Gemini, under Lupe Fiasco's 1st & 15th label, emerged in the rap game. Jemini threatened to sue him so Gemini was forced to change his name to GemStones.

In July 2014 a report from BoomBapBox.com revealed Jemini has changed his name to 'Big City' and is currently shopping a documentary about Ghetto Pop Life entitled 'Mice & Men' as well as working on new music and other projects.

Discography

Albums
 Ghetto Pop Life (2003)

EPs
 Scars and Pain (1995)
 Take Care of Business (2002) 
 Conceited Bastard (2003) 
 26 Inch EP (2003)

Singles
 "Funk Soul Sensation" (1995)
 "Who Wanna Step II Dis" (1997)
 "Who Wanna Step II Dis (Remix)" b/w "I.M.C.U.D.O.N.T. (I MC U Don't)" (1998)
 "The I.N.I." b/w "Makes the World Go Round" (2000)

Guest appearances
 2 Rude - "All You Need (I Can Love You Better)" and "Don`t Hate Me" from Rudimental 2K (1999)
 Chase Phoenix - "Feel So..." from Cut to the Chase (2004)
 Prince Po - "Hold Dat" and "Fall Back" from The Slickness (2004)

References

External links
 
 

Living people
Rappers from Brooklyn
Year of birth missing (living people)
Mercury Records artists
Tommy Boy Records artists
21st-century American rappers